Land of the Living may refer to:

 Land of the Living (album), an album by Kristine W
 Land of the Living (Kristine W song)
 Land of the Living (Pam Tillis song)
 Land of the Living (novel), a 2003 novel by Nicci French